was a Japanese policeman who in 1891 attempted to assassinate the Tsesarevich Nicholas Alexandrovich of Russia (later Emperor Nicholas II), in what became known as the Ōtsu incident. He was convicted for attempted murder and sentenced to life imprisonment.

Biography 
Born into a samurai family, his ancestors were doctors to the daimyōs of Iga.

In 1872 he was drafted into the army. He participated as a sergeant in the suppression of the uprising of the samurai in 1877 under the leadership of Saigō Takamori. His participation unsettled him, as Saigō Takamori was a symbol of Japanese spirit and dedication. From 1882 onward, he served in the police force.

Ōtsu incident 
In 1891, then-Tsesarevich Nicholas visited Japan during his eastern journeys. As the Russian party traveled through Ōtsu on May 11 (April 29 in the Russian Old Style), Tsuda, who was assigned to guard the street that the distinguished guests would follow, swung his saber at Nicholas, aiming at his head. Nicholas turned and the blow grazed him, leaving a 9-centimeter scar on his head.

At the trial, Tsuda indicated that he had attempted to assassinate Nicholas because he suspected that he was a Russian spy. Tsuda was sentenced to life imprisonment on May 25, 1891, which he had to serve in Hokkaido, often called "the Japanese Siberia". However, on September 30 of that year, Tsuda died in prison from pneumonia. According to another version, he starved himself to death.

In his native village after the incident, it was forbidden to give newborn children the name Tsuda, and his family became outcasts. There were also calls to rename the city of Ōtsu because of its association with the disgraceful act.

References

1855 births
1891 deaths
Failed assassins
Japanese police officers
Japanese prisoners sentenced to life imprisonment
Nicholas II of Russia
People from Musashi Province
Prisoners sentenced to life imprisonment by Japan
Prisoners who died in Japanese detention